The Ohio Supreme Court, Officially known as The Supreme Court of the State of Ohio is the highest court in the U.S. state of Ohio, with final authority over interpretations of Ohio law and the Ohio Constitution. The court has seven members, a chief justice and six associate justices, who are elected at large by the voters of Ohio for six-year terms. The court has a total of 1,550 other employees. Since 2004, the court has met in the Thomas J. Moyer Ohio Judicial Center (formerly known as the Ohio Departments Building) on the east bank of the Scioto River in Downtown Columbus. Prior to 2004, the court met in the James A. Rhodes State Office Tower and earlier in the Judiciary Annex (now the Senate Building) of the Ohio Statehouse.

The Ohio Supreme Court and the rest of the judiciary is established and authorized within Article IV of the Ohio Constitution.

Justices 

All the seats on the court are elected at large by the voters of Ohio. Every two years, two of the associate justice seats are up for election to a six-year term. For one of those three elections in a six-year cycle, the chief justice's seat is also up for election. In order to run for a seat on the court, a person must be admitted to the bar in Ohio, and have practiced as a lawyer or served as a judge for at least six years. There is an age limit: One may not run for a seat on any Ohio court if one is more than 70 years of age. This limit often forces the retirement of long-time justices. Justice Francis E. Sweeney, Sr., was barred by this rule from running for re-election in 2004, as was Justice Terrence O'Donnell in 2018 and as Chief Justice Maureen O'Connor will be in 2022. However, a judge who reaches the age of 70 after being elected is not prevented from completing her or his term in office.

The Governor of Ohio may appoint a Justice to the Court when there is a vacancy.

Until June 2021, judicial elections were non-partisan. This meant that parties nominated candidates in primary elections, but party designations for the candidates were not permitted on the general election ballot. Candidates and judges are also restricted in making public political statements. In response to the 2020 election of Democrat Jennifer Brunner, Ohio Republicans passed a law making general elections partisan, one of seven states to elect justices with party labels on the ballot. The Ohio Judicial Conference and Ohio Courts of Appeals Judges opposed the change, saying the judiciary should be independent of parties.

From the seating of Robert R. Cupp in 2007 to replace Democrat Alice Robie Resnick until the 2010 appointment of Eric Brown as chief justice, the court consisted entirely of Republicans who had been nominated through the primary process and won the general election, or who were appointed to an open seat by a Republican governor. This occurred once again in 2018 when Republican Mary DeGenaro was appointed to fill the seat vacated by the lone Democrat on the court, Bill O'Neill. Democrats once again joined the court in 2019 with the election of Michael Donnelly and Melody Stewart in November 2018.

Asterisks (*) next to retirement dates indicate justices who will be permitted to complete their current terms, but will be barred from running for reelection due to having exceeded the mandatory retirement age of 70 years.

In the court's history, there have been four instances where the female justices have outnumbered the male justices. The first occurred from January to May 2003, the second time occurred in 2005 and 2006, the third time occurred between January 2011 and January 2017, and the fourth time occurred beginning in January 2018.

History 
The Supreme Court of Ohio was founded in 1802, established in the state constitution as a three-member court, holding courts in each county every year. The constitution was approved that year, one year before statehood. In 1823, the state legislature ordered the court to meet annually in Columbus. It was located in the Ohio Statehouse beginning in 1857, and moved into the Statehouse Annex in 1901. The first female justice on the court was Florence E. Allen who served from 1923 to 1934. In 1974, the court moved from the annex building to the Rhodes State Office Tower. It moved to the Ohio Judicial Center in 2004.

Important cases 
In DeRolph v. State (1997) the Supreme Court of Ohio found that Ohio's method of funding its schools was unconstitutional. The case originated in the Perry County Schools.

In Mapp v. Ohio (1961), the U.S. Supreme Court reversed the Supreme Court of Ohio, and found that evidence seized unlawfully without a search warrant cannot be used in criminal prosecutions.

Compensation
As of 2018, the chief justice receives $174,700 per year and associate justices $164,000 per year.

Disciplinary Counsel
The Ohio Supreme Court Disciplinary Counsel investigates Ohio judges and attorneys in order to protect the public.  The Ohio Supreme Court announced through its website the dismissal of the former Disciplinary Counsel on August 29, 2013. As of 2018, Scott Drexel is the Disciplinary Counsel and his office investigates grievances.

See also 
Election Results, Ohio Supreme Court
List of Ohio politicians
List of Ohio politicians (by state office)
Ohio District Courts of Appeal
Ohio Seventh District Court of Appeals

References

External links 

Ohio Supreme Court Online
Opinions and Case Summaries of the Ohio Supreme Court

 
Ohio state courts
Ohio
1802 establishments in the Northwest Territory
Courts and tribunals established in 1802